UMIT Tirol - Private University for Health Sciences and Health Technology sees itself as a health university and is located in Hall in Tirol. It was founded in 2001 in Innsbruck under the name Private University of Medical Computer Science and Technology Tirol. In connection with the expansion of the health sciences in 2004, the university was re-named UMIT – Private University for Health Sciences, Medical Informatics and Technology. Today, it's a private university under the University Accreditation Act UniAkkG BGBl. The university is run by Tyrol (90 percent) and the University of Innsbruck (10 percent).

History 
UMIT Tirol was founded in 2001 as a subsidiary of Tirol Kliniken GmbH—formerly (until June 23, 2015) TILAK Tiroler Landeskrankenanstalten—(74.93 %) and Tiroler Zukunftsstiftung (25.07%). The first course offered were a bachelor's and a master's degree in Medical Informatics.
UMIT Tirol was accredited by the Austrian Accreditation Council (ÖAR) on 16 November 2001 for a period of five years. 
In the winter semester 2004/2005 the Tyrolean Private University UMIT TIROL moved from Innsbruck to Hall in Tyrol to a newly established campus (Eduard-Wallnöfer-Zentrum). 
In 2006 the accreditation by the Austrian Accreditation Council was extended until 2011 after an international assessment.

As a shareholder of UMIT Tirol, Tyrol endeavors to expand its excellent reputation in the field of health care through research and teaching at the highest level, on the one hand, and to strengthen the scientific location, on the other.

On 13 September 2010, the ÖAR canceled the accreditation for the doctoral program in Health Sciences due to a lack of qualitative supervision due to a large number of students and due to serious shortcomings both in the implementation and in the scientific orientation of the program. The poor quality of the dissertations was also deplored, for example in the subject of health sciences dissertations were written which had no relation to health and therefore should not have been accepted. The other bachelor's, master's, and doctorate programs were not affected by this decision.

Following an international review, the ÖAR was able to grant accreditation to seven new doctoral programs at UMIT Tirol in 2011. The basis for the ÖAR's decision was the assessment by six independent, international, external experts who subjected the Tyrolean private university to an intensive analysis and evaluation over several months.

In the same year 2011, after further international evaluation, UMIT Tirol was re-accredited for the third time until 2016 and meanwhile until 2021.

In the academic year 2012/13, a new high was reached with 432 first-year students.

In 2014, a branch was established in Landeck.

In 2014, at the initiative of the state, the shareholder structure of UMIT TIROL was adapted in order to give the University of Innsbruck a ten percent stake in UMIT Tirol. This will bring the University of Innsbruck and UMIT Tirol closer together in the direction of a "Campus Tirol". This is intended to strengthen future cooperation between the Tyrolean universities.

Since autumn 2016, the university bachelor's program in mechatronics at the Campus Technik Lienz in East Tyrol has been offered jointly by the Tyrolean private university UMIT TIROL and the Leopold Franzens University of Innsbruck.

In 2020, after a legal dispute with the Massachusetts Institute of Technology, the university changed its brand name to UMIT TIROL - The Tyrolean Private University.

Organisation 
The Tyrolean Private University UMIT GesmbH holds shares in other companies and competence centers.

The university's highest organs are the Scientific Advisory Board, the Vice-Chancellor's Office with the vice-chancellor and the deputy vice-chancellor and the Senate.

Department structure 
UMIT Tirol is divided into four departments with several subordinate institutes

 Department of Nursing Science and Gerontology
 Department of Public Health, Health Services Research and Health Technology Assessment
 Department of Psychology and Medical Sciences
 Department of Biomedical Computer Science and Mechatronics

Locations 
UMIT Tirol does not only offer its study programs at the campus in Hall but also maintains study centres at various locations, for example since 2014 in Landeck and 2016 in Lienz.

Studies and study programmes 
Bachelor studies
Mechatronik
Elektrotechnik
Pflegewissenschaften
Psychologie
Wirtschaft, Gesundheits- und Sporttourismus

Master's and diploma degree programms
Gesundheitswissenschaften
Pflege- und Gesundheitspädagogik
Pflege- und Gesundheitsmanagement
Advanced Nursing Practice
Nachhaltige Regional- und Destionationsmanagement
Public Health
Mechatronik
Psychologie
Medizinische Informatik

University courses
Universitätslehrgang Dyskalkulie
Universitätslehrgang Legasthenie
Autismus
Mediation und Konflikmanagement
Führungsaufgaben in der Gesundheits- und Krankenpflege
Lehraufgaben in der Gesundheits- und Krankenpflege
Health Information Management

Doctoral programmes
Technische Wissenschaften
Gesundheitsinformationssysteme
Sportmedizin, Gesundheitstourismus und Freizeitwissenschaften
Psychologie
Management und Ökonomie im Gesundheitswesen
Pflegewissenschaften
Pflegewissenschaften
Public Health
Health Technology Assessment

Tuition fees and student representation 
The tuition fees at UMIT Tirol range from €490 per semester for the Bachelor's programme in Mechatronics to €3,900 per semester for the doctoral programme.

After the amendment of the Austrian Student Union Act (HSG) in February 2005, students at private universities were no longer members of the ÖH, UMIT Tirol was one of the first private universities in Austria to establish its own student representation (name: StuVe). An amendment to the HSG 2014 established an ÖH representation at each private university, as at the public universities. ÖH UMIT has been responsible for UMIT TIROL students since 1 October 2014.

Notable people 
Ursula Gresser (* 1957), Internist and rheumatologist, professor since 2012
Bernhard Tilg (*1967), politician, professor since 2002, shortly afterward deputy vice-chancellor and from 2004 to 2008 vice-chancellor and CEO
Peter R. Steiner (*1955), hospital manager and honorary professor of medical law
Reinhold Haux, professor of medical informatics at the Technische Universität Braunschweig, 2001-2004 founding vice-chancellor of UMIT TIROL, 2007-2010 president of the International Medical Informatics Association

References

External links 
 Official website

Universities and colleges in Austria
Private universities and colleges in Austria
Education in Tyrol (state)